Hearthside Food Solutions, LLC is an American manufacturer of food products which has been implicated in workplace safety violations and the use of immigrant child labor.

On May 28, 2013, Post Holdings purchased the branded and private label cereal, granola and snacks business of Hearthside Food Solutions, which included the Golden Temple, Peace Cereal, Sweet Home Farm and Willamette Valley Granola Company brands, originally Yogi Bhajan's Sikh Dharma International's Golden Temple of Oregon's cereal division. Post combined this business with Attune Foods.

In 2014, Hearthside was acquired by Goldman Sachs Group and Vestar Capital Partners. In 2018, Goldman Sachs sold its interest in Hearthside to Charlesbank Capital Partners and Partners Gropup.

In 2021, Hearthside acquired from Weston Foods, a unit of George Weston Limited, six North American locations that produce cookies, crackers, cones, wafers and related baked products.

References

External links

Bakeries of the United States
Bakeries of Canada
Companies based in Illinois
Goldman Sachs
Companies established in 2009